Auckland Harbour Board v Commissioner of Inland Revenue [1999] NZCA 225; (1999) 19 NZTC 15,433 is a prominent case in New Zealand tax law regarding the issue of tax avoidance.

References

Judicial Committee of the Privy Council cases on appeal from New Zealand
2001 in New Zealand law
2001 in case law
Taxation in New Zealand